CLG Na Fianna is a Gaelic Athletic Association club based in Glasnevin, in the Northside of Dublin, Ireland. It caters for the sporting and social needs of many connected residential areas adjacent to its location through the promotion of Gaelic games — Gaelic football, hurling, camogie, handball and rounders—and the traditional Irish pursuits of music and dance. Céilí music and dancing is a regular feature in the club hall, while informal music sessions are a regular feature of the members’ bar.

Background
Na Fianna was officially formed as a club on 25 April 1955, when 201 members transferred from C.J. Kickham GAA Club to form Cumann Luthchleas Gael Na Fianna. The first Annual General Meeting took place on 27 October 1955 later that year. Na Fianna's first clubhouse was originally transported from the Guinness Sports Grounds in Crumlin to Mobhi Road but was burnt to the ground in May 1967. The members built a new clubhouse five years after the fire. Aras Na Fianna was the first GAA clubhouse in the country to include a members' bar and cater for all GAA sports including a handball alley. It served its members for almost twenty years before a further extension was built. Again in 2005 further extensions and a major refurbishment was undertaken reflecting the massive growth in membership in the intervening period

Na Fianna is a member of the Dublin GAA bodies in all the Gaelic codes of Gaelic football, hurling, camogie, ladies' football and handball, and is therefore affiliated to the national organisation, the Gaelic Athletic Association. Being in the parish of Glasnevin it connects to the many family residents in the Mobhi Road/ Homefarm Road/ Ballymun Road/ Botanic Road axis, while extending its influence  to the edges of Phibsboro, North Circular Road, Glasnevin Avenue, Drumcondra Road and Griffith Avenue, thus taking in all the Iona and Drumcondra residents also. The club also has affiliations with the many schools, both primary and post-primary, in this wide catchment area. The liaison between the club and schools offers parents and children a consistent engagement in sporting and non-sporting activities.

Na Fianna has been a leading proponent of Irish culture and the Na Fianna Céilí has long since been a tradition of the club. The club’s involvement in GAA Scór is an extension of its own regular internal Scór sessions. `

Football
Na Fianna have won the Dublin Senior Football Championship on five occasions, firstly in 1969 and for the second time, exactly ten years later in 1979. They eventually began their famous championship treble exactly twenty years later in 1999  and continued in 2000 and 2001.

After winning the Dublin Senior Football Championship in 1999, they went on to win the Leinster Senior Club Football Championship later that year defeating Sarsfield's, 1-11 to 0-8. They defeated Crossmolina Deel Rovers in the All-Ireland semi-final to qualify for the 2000 All-Ireland Senior Club Football Championship final against Crossmaglen Rangers of Armagh. Na Fianna were defeated in the final by a scoreline of 1-14 to 0-12. The match was played on St. Patricks Day in Croke Park with an attendance of 31,965.

Na Fianna Senior Ladies' team won the County Championship in 2009, the first time the ladies' section have won a championship at senior level. The final score was Na Fianna 1-11 Naomh Mearnog 1-10. The senior ladies' won their second title against Ballyboden St. Enda's in July 2011. The scoreline was 4-12 to 2-08. They went on to defeat Sarsfields from Laois in the Leinster Final on Sunday, 23 October 2011 on a scoreline of 3-03 to 0-10. They progressed to the All-Ireland Final as a result of defeating Donaghmore from County Cork on a scoreline of 2-09 to 0-10. Na Fianna contested the All-Ireland final on 27 November 2011 but unfortunately were defeated by Carnacon from County Mayo on a scoreline of 2-12 to 2-4. 

In 2010 Na Fianna's Under 14 football team won the Feile Peile na nOg Division One All-Ireland title for the first time in the club's history.

Na Fianna's Minor (Under 18) Football team have won the Dublin Minor Football "A" Championship 8 times in 1960, 1965, 1974, 1975, 2008, 2009, 2014 and 2017.

In 2013 Na Fianna completed a 3 in a row of Dublin Under 21 Football "A" Football Championship titles, defeating Ballyboden St. Enda's on a scoreline of 1-8 to 1-6. On a great day for the club, the second Under 21 team won the "C" Championship final, defeating Clan na Gael Fontenoy, 3-9 to 0-3.

Administration
In 2017, club member and former player, John Horan was elected as the 39th president of the GAA.

Roll of Honour
 Dublin Senior Football Championship: (5) 1969, 1979, 1999, 2000, 2001
 Leinster Senior Club Football Championship Winners (1) 1999-2000  Runners-Up 2000-01, 2001-02
 All-Ireland Senior Club Football Championship Runners-Up 2000
 Dublin Intermediate Football Championship Winners (1) 2017
 Dublin Junior Football Championship Winners (2) 1975, 2005
 Dublin Junior B Football Championship Winners 2010
 Dublin Junior D Football Championship Winners 2014
 Dublin Under 21 Football Championship Winners (5) 1977, 2011, 2012, 2013, 2017
 Dublin Under 21 C Football Championship: Winners 2013
 Dublin Under 21 D Football Championship: Winners 2011, 2016
 Dublin Minor A Football Championship Winners (8) 1960, 1965, 1974, 1975, 2008, 2009, 2014, 2017
 Dublin Minor D Football Championship Winners 2009, 2011
 Dublin Senior Football League Division 1 Winners 1979, 2012, 2014
 Dublin AFL Div. 3 Winners 2016
 Dublin AFL Div. 4 Winners 2011
 Dublin Senior Hurling League Division 1 Winners 2021
 Dublin Junior Hurling Championship Winners 1981, 1986, 1991, 2012
 Dublin Junior D Hurling Championship Winners 2009
 Dublin Junior F Hurling Championship Winners 2017
 Dublin Under 21 Hurling Championship Winners 2017, 2018
 Dublin Minor A Hurling Championship Winners (7) 1964, 1981, 2012, 2014, 2015, 2016, 2017
 Dublin Minor C Hurling Championship Winners 2013
 Dublin Minor D Hurling Championship Winners 2010, 2014
 Dublin Minor E Hurling Championship Winners 2007
 Dublin Ladies' Senior Football Championship Winners (3) 2009, 2011, 2014

World Record
On 7 May 2012, Na Fianna set a new Guinness world record for the most people to take part in a GAA training session. 1,100 children participated in the event, beating the previous record of 528 set by St Joseph's GAA Club from Glenavy, County Antrim, in May 2010.

Notable players 
Jonny Cooper Current Dublin inter-county football player
Conor McHugh Former Dublin inter-county football player
Niall McGovern Former Dublin inter-county football player
Jason Sherlock Former Dublin inter-county football player.
Dessie Farrell Former Dublin inter-county football player. Current Dublin senior football manager.
Senan Connell Former Dublin inter-county football player. Current Today FM and Sky Sports pundit
Kieran McGeeney Former Armagh inter-county football player. Current Armagh inter-county football manager
Enda McNulty Former Armagh inter-county football player
Jimmy Gray Former Dublin inter-county hurling and football player. Former Dublin inter-county hurling manager
 Tom Gray Former Dublin Under 21 football player. Former Dublin Minor and U-20 football manager
John Caffrey Former Dublin inter-county football player
Paul Caffrey Former Dublin inter-county football player. Former Dublin inter-county football manager
Joey Boland Former Dublin inter-county hurling player
 Shane Barrett Current Dublin inter-county hurling player
 Donal Burke Current Dublin inter-county hurling player
 Sean Currie Current Dublin inter-county hurling player
 Paul O'Dea Current Dublin inter-county hurling player
 Eoin Murchan Current Dublin inter-county football player
 Aaron Byrne Current Dublin inter-county football player
 Kenny Cunningham Former Republic of Ireland national football team captain

Ladies' Footballers
 Leah Caffrey
 Lucy Collins
 Orla Egan
 Hannah Tyrrell
 Mary Nevin

References

External links
CLG Na Fianna Web Site
Official Dublin Website
Dublin Club GAA
Na Fianna Info

1955 establishments in Ireland
Gaelic games clubs in Dublin (city)
Gaelic football clubs in Dublin (city)
Hurling clubs in Dublin (city)
Glasnevin